"Signal" is the fourth single released by Japanese singer and cellist Kanon Wakeshima, and second single from her album, Tsukinami. The song "Signal" was used as the ending of the anime television series Strike the Blood. The song reached number 54 on the Oricon Singles Chart and stayed on the chart for two weeks.

Track listing

Personnel
 Kanon Wakeshima – vocals, cello, piano, lyrics

References 

2014 singles
2014 songs
Kanon Wakeshima songs
Warner Music Japan singles
Anime songs